Close City is an unincorporated community in western Garza County, about  west-northwest of Post, Texas.  The small rural community lies on the High Plains of the Llano Estacado in West Texas.

The town site was chosen as the original location of Post City, a model community and social experiment conceived by C. W. Post, an American breakfast cereal and foods manufacturer.  In the early 1890s, Post developed a popular caffeine-free coffee substitute called Postum, and later made a fortune on breakfast cereals such as Grape Nuts and Post Toasties.  As Post's wealth grew, his interests began to expand into other areas.  One project that had always intrigued him was the creation of a planned community of model homes and industry.  His success in the prepared-foods industry provided the financial resources to begin this project.

C. W. Post initially chose a site on the  Llano Estacado for his projected settlement. Post ordered work to stop and he shifted resources to a site located nearer the center of the county. The new site, located below the Caprock, is the present-day location of Post.

The original town site, called Ragtown, was renamed Close City, named after  Edward Bennett "E.B." Close, who married Post's daughter, Marjorie Merriweather Post, in 1905. Although some residents stayed, the town developed slowly and consequently remained a small rural community.  Today, Close City is primarily a farming community. The primary crop is cotton, but lesser amounts of grain sorghum and winter wheat are also grown in the area.  Crops are grown on a mixture of  irrigated and dryland farms.  Water for irrigation is pumped from the underlying Ogallala Aquifer, and is usually applied using center-pivot irrigation systems. The Ogallala Aquifer is quickly becoming depleted, so sometime in the future, all farms may have to revert to dryland agriculture.

In 1909, Close City students attended school in a one-room wooden schoolhouse.  In 1919, George Samson and Jimmie Napier built a new brick schoolhouse, which served the community well until 1965, when Close City School was consolidated with Post schools.

The only paved road that passes through Close City is Farm to Market Road 399. The BNSF Railway, which extends from Post to Lubbock, passes  to the east.

See also
Post Cereals
Estacado, Texas
Canyon Valley, Texas
South Plains
West Texas

References

External links

Unincorporated communities in Garza County, Texas
Unincorporated communities in Texas